Tommy is a masculine given name, frequently a short form of Thomas. Tommy may refer to:

People

Arts and entertainment
Tommy Brown (record producer) (born 1986), music producer and songwriter
Tommy Brown (singer) (1931–2016), American R&B singer
Tommy Cairo (born 1958) former American professional wrestler 
Tommy Cannon (born 1938), British comedian
Tommy Chong (born 1938), actor, writer, director, musician, and comedian, half of the Cheech & Chong comedy duo.
Tommy Collins (singer) (1930–2000), stage name of Leonard Sipes, American country music singer-songwriter
Tommy Cooper (1921–1984), prop comedian and magician
Tommy Davidson (born 1965), American actor
Tommy DeBarge, American R'n'B musician formerly of the band Switch
Tommy Dorfman (born 1992), American actress 
Tommy Dorsey (1905–1956), American jazz trombonist, trumpeter, composer, and bandleader of the Big Band era
Tommy Emmanuel (born 1955), Australian guitarist
Tommy Engel (born 1949), German musician 
Tommy Finke (born 1981), German singer/songwriter
Tommy Hilfiger (born 1951), fashion designer
Tommy Hunter (born 1937), Canadian country music performer, star of The Tommy Hunter Show on television
Tommy Lee Jones (born 1946), American actor
Tommy Keene (1958–2017), American singer-songwriter
Tommy Knight (born 1993), English child actor
Tommy Lee (born 1962), drummer for glam metal band Mötley Crüe
Tommy Makem (1932–2007) Irish-American musician
Tommy Mottola (born 1949), American music executive, former husband of Mariah Carey
Tommy Page (1970–2017), American singer-songwriter
Tommy Ramone (1951–2014), Hungarian-American musician and record producer, founding member of The Ramones
Tommy Giles Rogers, Jr. (born 1980), singer and keyboardist of heavy metal band Between the Buried and Me
Tommy Rogers (1961–2015), American professional wrestler
Tommy Sands (American singer) (born 1937), American pop music singer and actor
Tommy Sands (Irish singer) (born 1945), Northern Irish folk singer, songwriter, radio broadcaster, and political activist
Tommy Shaw (born 1953), guitarist for the band Styx
Tommy Smith (playwright), American playwright
Tommy Smith (DJ) (born 1954), radio disc jockey from Little Rock, Arkansas
Tommy Smith (saxophonist) (born 1967), Scottish jazz saxophonist, composer and educator
Tommy Sotomayor, American radio show host and YouTube personality
Tommy Steele (born 1936), Britain's first teen idol and rock 'n' roll star
Tommy Stinson (born 1966), American rock musician
Tommy Trinder (1909-1989), English comedian 
Tommy Tune (born 1939), American dancer, actor
Tommy Wiseau, American film producer/director
Tommy Young, (born 1947) professional wrestling referee and retired professional wrestler
 Tommy February6 and Tommy Heavenly6, stage names for Japanese singer Tomoko Kawase

Politics
Tommy Douglas (1904–1986), Scottish-born Canadian politician, father of universal healthcare in Canada
Tommy Osmeña (born 1948), Filipino politician, Mayor of Cebu City
Tommy Suharto (born 1962), Indonesian politician
Tommy Thompson (born 1941), American politician

Sports
Tommy Alcedo (born 1976), Venezuelan road cyclist
Tommy Asnip (1883–1918), English footballer
Tommy Boutwell (born 1946), American football player
Tommy Brown (disambiguation), multiple people
Tommy Burns (born Noah Brusso; 1881-1955), Canadian boxer and world heavyweight champion
Geoffrey M. Murphy (1922-2011), Australian boxer and welterweight champion, better known as Tommy Burns
Tommy Curtis (1952–2021), American basketball player
Tommy Docherty (born 1928), Scottish former footballer and football manager
Tommy Edman (born 1995), American baseball player
Tommy Ekblom (born 1959), Finnish long-distance runner
Tommy Everidge (born 1983), American baseball player and coach
Tommy Frevert (born 1986), American football player
Tommy Giacomelli (born 1974), or simply 'Tommy', Brazilian former association football player
Tommy Green (disambiguation), multiple people
Tommy Haas (born 1978), German tennis player
Tommy Henry (American football) (born 1969), American football player
Tommy Henry (baseball) (born 1997), American baseball player
Tommy Hottovy (born 1981), American baseball player and coach
Tommy Hudson (born 1997), American football player
Tommy Hunter (baseball) (born 1986), American Major League Baseball pitcher
Tommy Hunter (footballer) (1863–1918), English footballer
Tommy Kahnle (born 1989), American baseball player
Tommy Lasorda (1927–2021), American Major League Baseball manager and player
Tommy La Stella (born 1989), American baseball player
Tommy Lee (footballer) (born 1986), football goalkeeper for Chesterfield F.C.
Tommy Lloyd (born 1974), American basketball coach
Tommy Milone (born 1987), American baseball player
Tommy Nance (born 1991), American baseball player
Tommy Northcott (1931–2008), English footballer
Tommy Paul (tennis) (born 1997), American tennis player
Tommy Pham (born 1988), American baseball player
Tommy Robredo (born 1982), Spanish tennis player
Tommy Romero (born 1997), American baseball player
Tommy Sale (1910–1990), English footballer
Tom Simpson (1937–1967), British cyclist
Tommy Smith (disambiguation), multiple people
Tommy Sørensen (born 1979), Danish badminton player
Tommy Sugiarto (born 1988), Indonesian badminton player
Tommy Stevens (born 1996), American football player
Tommy Sweeney (born 1997), American football player
Tommy Togiai (born 1999), American football player
Tommy Tolleson (born 1943), American football player
Tommy Townsend (born 1996), American football player
Tommy Tremble (born 2000), American football player
Tommy Walker (disambiguation), multiple people
Tommy Walsh (hurler, born 1983) (born 1983), hurler with Kilkenny GAA
Tommy Walsh (Kerry footballer) (born 1988), Gaelic footballer and Australian rules footballer
Tommy Walsh (Wicklow Gaelic footballer), Gaelic footballer with Wicklow GAA (2007–2009)
Tommy Watkins (born 1980), American baseball player and coach
Tommy Whelan (1911–1974), American football player

Other
Poltpalingada Booboorowie (c. 1830–1901), known as Tommy Walker, Australian Aboriginal personality
Tommy Alexandersson (born 1948), Swedish mass murderer
Thomas Gambino (born 1929), Italian-American mobster
Thomas Ricketts (1901–1967), at age 17, the youngest soldier to be awarded the Victoria Cross as a combatant
Tommy Brown (NAAFI assistant) (c. 1926–1945), youngest recipient of the George Medal, involved in retrieving code books invaluable in breaking the German Second World War Enigma code
Tommy Lynn Sells (1964–2014), American serial killer
Tommy O'Connor (1880–1951), American fugitive
Tommy Pangcoga (born 1972), writer and non-government organization worker based in Mindanao
Tommy Solomon (1884–1933), believed by most to have been the last true Moriori, the indigenous people of the Chatham Islands
Tommy Walsh (builder) (born 1956), English celebrity builder

Fictional characters
Tommy (comics), former member of the Morlocks in the Marvel Comics universe
Tommy, a character in The Karate Kid and Cobra Kai, who is a friend of Johnny
Tommy Carcetti, in the TV series The Wire
Tommy Garvey, main character in HBO series The Leftovers played by Chris Zylka
Tommy Gavin, lead character in the FX drama Rescue Me
Tommy Jarvis, recurring character in the Friday the 13th franchise
Tommy Monaghan, also known as Hitman, a super-powered assassin in DC Comics, created by Garth Ennis
Tommy Oliver, one of the main characters from the Power Rangers TV series
Tommy Pickles, main character in the Rugrats and All Grown Up! TV series
Tommy Shelby, main protagonist in British television series Peaky Blinders
Tommy Settergren, a Pippi Longstocking character
Tommy Shepherd, a.k.a. Speed, a Marvel Comics superhero
Tommy Solomon (3rd Rock from the Sun), one of the main characters from the sitcom
Tommy Vercetti, the main protagonist from 2002 video game Grand Theft Auto: Vice City
Tommy Walker (Brothers & Sisters), on the TV series Brothers & Sisters

See also
Tommi, Finnish given name
Tommie, given name
Tommy Robinson (disambiguation)

English masculine given names
Masculine given names
Hypocorisms